Bushido is a DC Comics superhero who was a short-lived member of the Teen Titans.

Publication history
Bushido appears in Titans Annual #1 (2000) and was created by Geoff Johns and Ben Raab.

Fictional character biography
Ryuku Orsono is a Japanese teenager who becomes a bushidōka upon his mother's death, which fulfills a long family line of honorary heroes. He first encountered the Teen Titans in Titans Annual #1, when they come to Japan in order to free their team member Beast Boy from the possession of the demon Tengu. Bushido uses his mystical sword to sever the head of Beast Boy; the magical sword drives out Tengu without harming Logan.

In Titans Secret Files #2, Bushido joins the short lived Titans L.A. before its dissolution. During his tenure his teammates were Herald, Bumblebee, Hero Cruz. Terra II, Flamebird, Captain Marvel Jr. and Beast Boy.

Bushido joins an improvised Titans group in battling the rampaging Superboy-Prime. The battle ends up outside of Keystone City. After Pantha and Baby Wildebeest are killed, Bushido attacks Prime and is blasted in half by Prime's heat vision. This battle is also covered in more detail in the Titans own series.

During the events of Blackest Night, Bushido is reanimated as a member of the Black Lantern Corps along with the other heroes killed by Superboy-Prime and head for Earth Prime to torment him. Superboy-Prime destroys them by using the black ring cycling through the power set of emotions resulting in a burst of colored energy that destroys Black Lanterns.

Powers and abilities
Bushido is skilled in the martial arts, especially in swordsmanship. His primary weapons are the naginata and the jitte, as well as the hachiwara and the shuriken. Each weapon is imbued with the soul of the warrior who wielded it, and these spirits guide Ryuko in battle.

In other media
 Bushido appears in Teen Titans, voiced by Dee Bradley Baker. This version is a largely silent young samurai. In the episode "Calling All Titans", he is approached by Robin, who makes Bushido an honorary member of the eponymous Teen Titans, but the latter is ambushed, captured, and flash-frozen by the Brotherhood of Evil. In "Titans Together", Más y Menos free the Brotherhood's captives, allowing the united Teen Titans to defeat and flash-freeze the Brotherhood.
 The Teen Titans animated series incarnation of Bushido appears in issue #34 of Teen Titans Go!.

References

Comics characters introduced in 2000
DC Comics male superheroes
Fictional samurai
DC Comics martial artists
Characters created by Geoff Johns